BRP Mangyan (AS71) is an auxiliary ship of the Philippine Navy, formerly the freight supply ship U.S. Army FS-524, built for the United States Army during World War II.

Service history
The vessel was commissioned on 1 July 1944, manned by Coast Guard personnel, and assigned to the South-west Pacific and Western Pacific areas. She was decommissioned on 11 October 1945.

Later turned over to the United States Navy, then she was transferred to the Japan Maritime Self-Defense Force as JDS Miho (MST-472) on 31 March 1955. Together with her sistership JDS Nasami (MST-471,ex-FS-408), they converted to the minesweeper tender. Miho was used in minesweeping missions and limited transport services until 1974.

The Philippine government acquired the ship through Foreign Military Sales (FMS) from the United States government. She underwent extensive repairs at the Maebata Shipbuilding Inc. in Sasebo, Japan in 1978 until she was finally turned over to the Philippine Navy. On 27 March 1979, she was commissioned as BRP Mangyan (AS71) named after the Mangyan peoples, an ethnic minority on Mindoro island.

References

 

Ships of the United States Army
1944 ships
Design 381 coastal freighters
Transport ships of the United States Army
Auxiliary ships of the Philippine Navy
Mine warfare vessels of the Japan Maritime Self-Defense Force